It's Monk's Time (1964) is the third studio album Thelonious Monk released on Columbia Records, and his sixth overall for that label.  It featured three original compositions as well as three jazz standards.

Track listing
Side One
"Lulu's Back In Town" (Al Dubin, Harry Warren) – 9:55
"Memories of You" (Andy Razaf, Eubie Blake) – 6:06
"Stuffy Turkey" (Thelonious Monk) – 8:16
Side Two
"Brake's Sake" (Monk) – 12:29
"Nice Work If You Can Get It" (George Gershwin, Ira Gershwin) – 4:15
"Shuffle Boil" (Monk) – 7:09

Bonus Tracks on 2012 reissue
"Epistrophy" (Kenny Clarke, Monk) - 5:04
"Nice Work If You Can Get It" (Alternate take) - 4:06
"Shuffle Boil" (Alternate take) - 4:51

Notes
Tracks 5, 6 and 8 recorded January 29, 1964.
Tracks 3 and 7 recorded January 30, 1964.
Tracks 1 and 4 recorded February 10, 1964.
Track 2 and 9 recorded March 9, 1964.

Personnel
Thelonious Monk – piano
Butch Warren – bass
Ben Riley – drums
 Charlie Rouse – tenor saxophone
Teo Macero – producer

References

 

Thelonious Monk albums
1964 albums
Columbia Records albums
Albums produced by Teo Macero